Alternaria alternata f.sp. lycopersici is a plant pathogen.

External links
 USDA ARS Fungal Database

Alternaria
Fungal plant pathogens and diseases
Forma specialis taxa